Filip Leščak (born 13 December 1960) is a Slovenian judoka. He competed at the 1984 Summer Olympics and the 1988 Summer Olympics, representing Yugoslavia, and at the 1992 Summer Olympics, representing Slovenia.

References

1960 births
Living people
Slovenian male judoka
Olympic judoka of Slovenia
Olympic judoka of Yugoslavia
Judoka at the 1984 Summer Olympics
Judoka at the 1988 Summer Olympics
Judoka at the 1992 Summer Olympics
Sportspeople from Maribor